Alloa railway station may refer to:

Alloa railway station is a former North British Railway station, re-opened in 2008
South Alloa railway station originally called Alloa, a closed former Caledonian Railway station
Alloa Junction railway station
Alloa Ferry railway station
Alloa North railway station may refer to:
Alloa railway station was called Alloa North (sometimes North Alloa) from 1875 to 1882
Alloa Ferry railway station was also known as Alloa North railway station